is a  deck arch bridge in the southern Hakkōda Mountains in the city of Aomori in Aomori Prefecture, Japan. Located inside of Towada-Hachimantai National Park, the bridge is known as being a place for observing the area's scenic beauty as well as being the longest of its type in Japan.

Description
It is equipped with two meter-wide sidewalks on each side of the bridge. It is the longest deck arch bridge in Japan. The bridge is known as tourist destination because the panoramic views it affords of the Hakkōda Mountains in Towada-Hachimantai National Park. The Jōgakura Bridge becomes especially crowded with tourists when the surrounding Siebold's beech forests begin to change color during autumn.

History
Jōgakura Bridge was opened to traffic on 27 October 1995, replacing an older bridge that was heavily impacted by the rapid deterioration of the columnar jointed andesite rock that it was built on. The total cost of its construction was 87 billion yen.

Suicides
The bridge's height makes it a target for jumpers. In the event of someone jumping from the bridge, the approaches to the bridge are closed to traffic while helicopter teams attempt to recover the jumper from the valley below. Some blame paranormal activity for the suicides, claiming that the bridge and its surroundings are haunted by the spirits of the troops that died in the Hakkōda Mountains incident and that they pull or compel visitors off the bridge, usually at night.

References

External links

Jōgakura Bridge traffic web camera

Arch bridges in Japan
Bridges completed in 1995
Tourist attractions in Aomori Prefecture
Bridges in Aomori Prefecture
Roads in Aomori Prefecture
Aomori (city)
1995 establishments in Japan